The Human Animal is a 1954 book by the anthropologist Weston La Barre, in which the author discusses the psychoanalytical approach to psychology and culture. The classicist Norman O. Brown described the book as the most significant attempt at creating a "general theory of language" through a synthesis of psychoanalysis with other disciplines.

References

Bibliography
Books

 

1954 non-fiction books
Books about psychoanalysis
English-language books
University of Chicago Press books